Ruffano is a town and comune in the province of Lecce, located in the Apulia region of southeast Italy.

Main sights
Mother church of Natività della Beata Maria Vergine (1706–1713)
Church of Madonna del Carmine, built in the 16th century above a Byzantine cave church from the 12th century
Castello Brancaccio, a castle overlooking the town (1626)
Crucifix Crypt, near the boundary with Casarano
Grotta della Trinità ("Trinity Grotto"), used since Neolithic times. Starting from the 9th century, it housed a community of hermit monks and in the 11th century, it was turned into a religious place, as testified by remains of Byzantine frescoes.

References

Cities and towns in Apulia
Localities of Salento